Igor Dmitriyevich Novikov (born November 10, 1935) is a Russian (and former Soviet) theoretical astrophysicist and cosmologist.

Novikov put forward the idea of white holes in 1964. He also formulated the Novikov self-consistency principle in the mid-1980s, a contribution to the theory of time travel.

Novikov moved to Copenhagen, Denmark, where he has been working and teaching at the Niels Bohr Institute.

Biography
Novikov gained his PhD degree in astrophysics in 1965 and the Russian D.Sc. degree in astrophysics in 1970. From 1974 to 1990 he was head of the Department of Relativistic Astrophysics at the Russian Space Research Institute in Moscow. Before 1991 he was head of the Department of Theoretical Astrophysics at the Lebedev Physical Institute in Moscow and has been a professor at Moscow State University. Since 1994 he has been director of the Theoretical Astrophysics Center (TAC) of the University of Copenhagen, Denmark. He is currently also a professor of astrophysics at the Observatory of the University of Copenhagen, where he has been since 1991. Since 1998 he has been a Fellow of the Royal Astronomical Society.

He is awarded the First John Archibald Wheeler Prize (2020), together with physicist Kip Thorne (Caltech) and Oxford University professor Roger Penrose. This award is presented for his contribution to the development of the general theory of relativity and the physics of black holes. The prize is awarded by the President of the Italian Physical Society at the official awards ceremony in Rome on May 22, 2020.

See also
Closed timelike curve
Cosmic microwave background
Observational cosmology
Quantum mechanics of time travel
Primordial black hole
Superradiance
White hole

References

General references

External links 

 Oral history interview transcript with Igor Dmitriyevich Novikov on 21 August 1979, American Institute of Physics, Niels Bohr Library & Archives - interview conducted with Spencer R. Weart in Montreal, Canada 

Novikov, Igor Dmitrievich
Novikov, Igor Dmitrievich
Novikov, Igor D.
Novikov, Igor D.
Novikov, Igor Dmitrievich
Novikov, Igor D.
Corresponding Members of the Russian Academy of Sciences